Buena Vista Hills  may refer to:
 Buena Vista Hills (Kern County) in California, USA
 Buena Vista Hills (San Diego County) in California, USA